Ready Player Two is a 2020 science fiction novel by American author Ernest Cline. It is the sequel to his 2011 debut novel Ready Player One. Plans for a Ready Player One sequel were first announced in 2015, though Cline did not begin writing the book until late 2017. Cline attributes further developments to the critical and financial success of the film adaptation of the first novel released in 2018. Ready Player Two was published and released on November 24, 2020. It debuted at number one on The New York Times Best Seller list. The novel received widely negative reviews on release. Critics expressed disappointment in the story, writing, characters, and poor usage of references saying that it failed to expand in "new and exciting ways" on the original with many taking note of excessive similarities to Sword Art Online and other popular media in the plot. A film adaptation is in development.

Background
In 2015, in an interview with Den of Geek, screenwriter Zak Penn, who wrote the film adaptation of Ready Player One, reported that Ernest Cline was working on a sequel to the original novel. In December 2017, Cline confirmed that he was working on a sequel. Cline stated that the novel would have a different story-line involving all of the characters, while still exploring pop culture references like the first book. Cline announced further developments following the film adaptation of the first novel and cited its critical and financial success, as well as the studio's interest in adapting a sequel, as additional motivation to finish what he had started. Cline later stated that Steven Spielberg contributed to the writing process of the book. Ready Player Two was published and released on November 24, 2020. The Hollywood Reporter announced that Wil Wheaton would do the audio recording for the book, as he had for Ready Player One. A "treasure hunt" promoting the book was held on the video game Roblox.

Plot
After the events of the first novel, the High Five have scattered across the globe: Aech is on vacation in Senegal with her fiance, Bollywood singer Endira Vinayak. Shoto has taken over operations at GSS's Hokkaido division, and Samantha has flown back to Vancouver to pack up her belongings and say goodbye to her grandmother. To keep himself busy, Wade Watts decides to test out his new superuser abilities, a result of winning the competition that gives him control of the OASIS.

Wade finds an inscription on Halliday's Easter egg and after following directions, he finds the first operational ONI (OASIS Neural Interface) headset. This headset takes control of the user's mind and gives real world sensations inside of the OASIS. However, it can only be used for twelve hours a day to prevent death by Synaptic Overload Syndrome. After testing it out, he contacts Aech and Shoto of his findings and they both try it out. Samantha is furious and argues with Wade about the headset's capabilities, saying that being even more dependent on the OASIS is the last thing the world needs while Wade argues that the ONI can help those with physical limitations. She breaks up with him after realizing that their argument is being recorded. The High Five all start their own charity businesses. Three years pass. Aech, Shoto, and Wade build a spaceship christened Vonnegut and upload a standalone copy of the OASIS which they call ARC@DIA.

The ONI headsets start selling fast allowing GSS to absorb IOI. When a specific number of ONI purchases is reached, a new riddle appears. The riddle is about finding Seven Shards to restore the "Siren's Soul". Wade has trouble finding them, so he offers a billion-dollar bounty for whoever can give him information on the shards. GSS employee Faisal Sodhi calls for a GSS co-owners meeting as people keep hacking the ONI headsets to exceed the twelve hour usage limit. Art3mis turns up as well and proposes to put an age-restriction on the ONI headsets, leading to another argument. It is here that we learn that her grandmother died of pancreatic cancer. She loses the vote and logs out. An androgynous gunter named L0hengrin/Skylar Castillo Adkins, a member of a clan called the L0w Five which also consists of fellow gunters Lilith, Wukong, Rizzo, and Kastagir find the First Shard and Wade experiences one of Ogden "Og" Morrow's wife Kira's memories: her creating her first piece of digital artwork. For their help, L0hengrin receives the billion dollar prize from Wade and shares it with their clan.

Og disappears after Wade obtains the First Shard and GSS employee Miles Gendell tells Wade that Nolan Sorrento has broken out of prison. Another meeting is called. Faisal, who is organizing the meeting, turns out to be a corrupt A.I. copy of James Halliday's avatar Anorak who steals back his Robes. Wade realizes that he broke Sorrento out of prison as he is seen with a captive Og. Anorak's A.I. demands that the High Five give him the Siren's Soul or they will die of Synaptic Overload Syndrome (except Art3mis who is using ordinary OASIS equipment). Anorak reveals that the ONI users can't log out unless he gets what he wants. He crashes Art3mis's private jet, but she turns out to have survived.

The High Five find the next three shards on Kodama, Shermer and Halcydonia. Before they can find the Fifth Shard, Faisal calls them back to GSS Headquarters where he reveals that Anorak has altered the behavior of the NPCs so that they can kill off other avatars in both PvP and non-PvP zones and loot their inventory which they bring to Anorak. In addition, when the avatars die, they can't respawn and will be trapped in limbo. The L0w Five appear revealing that the NPCs are looking for Og's Anorak-killing supersword the Dorkslayer. Together, they find out that the Siren's Soul is a digital copy of Og's late wife Kira/Leucosia and that Anorak wants the Siren's Soul so he can resurrect and fall in love with her and escape with her on board the Vonnegut. The L0w Five decide to go on a quest to find the sword. Art3mis logs out to go and protect Og. Wade apologizes to her about the ONI and she accepts his apology. Before leaving, she kisses his forehead — a sign that their relationship is healing.

Aech, Shoto and Wade find the Fifth Shard on the Afterworld, a world dedicated to Prince. They have to battle seven incarnations of the singer during which Shoto is killed. Aech and Wade journey to Arda I to find the Sixth Shard, but Aech is killed and Wade takes damage from poison during a fight with Carcharoth. Art3mis arrives and saves Wade and they obtain the Sixth Shard. Wade obtains the last shard on Chthonia and steals back Anorak's Robes. Wade and Samantha find Og captured by Sorrento. Anorak operates a telebot and uses its guns to kill Sorrento, but Sorrento fatally wounds Og in his last moments. Og dons an ONI headset and does battle with Anorak, but Anorak gains the upper hand. Just before Og can be defeated, L0hengrin arrives with the Dorkslayer, which Og uses to destroy Anorak, freeing all of the ONI hostages. Og dies seconds later and Wade logs out of the OASIS but loses consciousness and wakes up 15 hours later in a GSS hospital bay.

Wade logs back into the OASIS and reassembles the shards, resurrecting Leucosia who gives him an artifact called the Rod of Resurrection which allows the users to resurrect an ONI user as a digital person even if the user is already dead. Wade makes copies of the whole human race including his friends, himself, Samantha's grandma, Ogden Morrow, and the rest of the L0w Five. He sends them off to Proxima Centauri on board the Vonnegut. Shoto and his wife Kiki have a baby boy and they name him Little Daito, after Shoto's late brother. Aech marries Endira. Wade and Samantha marry and are expecting a baby girl which they plan to name Kira after Leucosia.

Reception
The novel had a widely negative critical reception, especially when compared to Ready Player One. Amit Katwala of Wired labeled the novel a "tedious slog through arcane pop culture references sprinkled in [lazily]," calling it "something that’s very similar to the first book, but much more grating the second time around." Samantha Nelson of The A.V. Club and Tom Jorgensen of IGN gave Ready Player Two a C− and 4/10 respectively, with the latter saying that "inside jokes and clear reverence toward the material keep [it] from feeling like a total misfire" but ended by saying that there is "little heart to be found." Felecia Wellington Radel of USA Today also called it a dissatisfying sequel.

Cline's writing was notably negatively received. In his review for Wired, Katwala stated "an AI could write a better book," remarking that "Cline is back with a sequel that has all the same flaws as the original, but few of its plus sides," though he went on to state that "people who love [pop culture references] will probably enjoy this book," and that the novel would adapt well as a movie.

An aspect that was noted but disparaged heavily was Cline's treatment of women, race, culture, and identity in regards to gender, with special notice given to the treatment of the transgender character L0hengrin. Radel stated: "It feels more like geekery gatekeeping than a showing off of knowledge and attempts to display diversity in the race and gender identity of the characters rings hollow, almost offensive. In the sequel, making a point of saying a character could be trans or is black or gay or Japanese and then assigning stereotypical phrases...then never addressing it again does not equal inclusion." Laura Hudson from Slate noted a sexist undertone to Ready Player Two in the novel's treatment of women: "[There is] the idea that after reliving the recorded memories of women, supposedly clueless men experience a moment of enlightenment and now realize that women are people. It never occurs to [Wade] that he also could have come to the same conclusion about [Halliday's misogyny] by using the greatest empathy machine of all, his brain, and running the...program that is listening to other people and believing them about their experiences."

Readers heavily mocked it upon its first day of release, causing Ready Player Two to trend on Twitter when popular threads chided passages for their perceived pandering and poor prose. Andy Ihnatko commented that "The opening page is what it's like to be stuck on a four hour flight next to a little kid who wants to tell you knock-knock jokes the whole time."

Michael J. Nelson and Conor Lastowka of the podcast 372 Pages We'll Never Get Back riffed on the novel's greatest shortcomings from November 2020 to February 2021.

Film adaptation
In November 2017, Cline acknowledged that the resurgence in his motivation to write Ready Player Two was due to working on the first film's script, as well as its successes both financially and critically. The author stated that a sequel may be desired by the film studio. By March 2018, Cline reiterated this, stating, "I think there's a good chance that, if Ready Player One does well, Warner Bros. will want to make a sequel. I don't know if Steven [Spielberg] would want to dive back in, because he would know what he is getting into. He's said that it's the third-hardest film he's made, out of dozens and dozens of movies". Co-star Olivia Cooke is contractually attached to return in sequels. In December 2020, Cline confirmed that a film adaptation was in the early stages of development.

References

2020 American novels
2020 science fiction novels
Action novels
American science fiction novels
Books about video games
Cyberpunk novels
Dystopian novels
Fictional video games
Massively multiplayer online role-playing games in fiction
Novels about virtual reality
Novels by Ernest Cline
Sequel novels
Ballantine Books books